Yolanda Gail Devers (born November 19, 1966) is an American retired track and field sprinter who competed in the 60 metres, 60 m hurdles, 100 m and 100 m hurdles. One of the greatest and most decorated female sprinters of all time, she was the 1993, 1997 and 2004 world indoor champion in the 60 m, while in the 60 m hurdles, she was the 2003 world indoor champion and 2004 silver medalist. In the 100 m, she is the second woman in history to defend an Olympic 100 m title, winning gold at both the 1992 and 1996 Olympics. She was also the 1993 world champion in the event, becoming the first ever female sprinter to simultaneously hold the world and Olympic titles in the 100m. In the 100 m hurdles, she was the 1993, 1995 and 1999 world champion, and the 1991 and 2001 world silver medalist. In 2011, she was inducted into the National Track and Field Hall of Fame.

Life and career
Devers was born in Seattle, Washington, and grew up near National City, California, graduating from Sweetwater High School in 1984. Sweetwater's football and track stadium would later be named Gail Devers Stadium. A young talent in the 100 m and 100 m hurdles, Devers was in training for the 1988 Summer Olympics, started experiencing health problems, suffering from among others migraine and vision loss. She qualified for the Olympics 100 m hurdles, in which she was eliminated in the semi-finals, but her health continued to deteriorate even further.

Devers started in 800m in high school and ran a personal best of 2:08.

In 1990, she was diagnosed with Graves' disease and underwent radioactive iodine treatment followed by thyroid hormone replacement therapy. During her radiation treatment, Devers began to develop blistering and swelling of her feet.  Eventually, the sprinter could barely walk and had to crawl or be carried.  A doctor considered amputating her feet.  Amazingly, Devers recovered after the radiation treatment was discontinued, and she resumed training. At the 1991 World Championships, she won a silver medal in the 100 m hurdles.

At the 1992 Summer Olympics, Devers starred. She qualified for the final of the 100 m, which ended in an exciting finish, with five women finishing close (within 0.06 seconds). The photo finish showed Devers had narrowly beaten Jamaican Juliet Cuthbert. In the final of the 100 m hurdles, Devers' lead event, she seemed to be running towards a second gold medal, when she hit the final hurdle and stumbled over the finish line in fifth place, leaving Voula Patoulidou from Greece as the upset winner.

In 1993, Devers won the 1993 World Championships in Athletics 100 m title after - again - a photo finish win over Merlene Ottey in an apparent dead heat, and the 100 m hurdles title. She retained her hurdles title in 1995.

The 100 m final at the 1996 Summer Olympics was an almost exact repeat of the World Championships final three years before. Ottey and Devers again finished in the same time and did not know who had won the race. Again, both were awarded the same time of 10.94 seconds, but Devers was judged to have finished first and became the first woman to retain the Olympic 100 m title since Wyomia Tyus. Shelly-Ann Fraser-Pryce duplicated the feat in 2012, and Elaine Thompson-Herah in 2021. In the final of her favorite event, Devers again failed, as she finished fourth and outside of the medals. With the 4 × 100 m relay team, Devers won her third Olympic gold medal.

After these Olympics, Devers concentrated on the hurdles event, winning the World Championship again in 1999, but she had to forfeit for the semi-finals at the 2000 Summer Olympics.

Devers competed in the 100 m and 100 m hurdles at the 2004 Summer Olympics in Athens, her fifth Olympic Games.

Devers left competition in 2005 to give birth to a child with her husband and returned in 2006.

On February 2, 2007, at the age of 40, Devers edged 2004 Olympic champion Joanna Hayes to win the 60 m hurdles event at the Millrose Games in 7.86 seconds - the best time in the world that season and just 0.12 off the record she set in 2003. Furthermore, the time bettered the listed World Record for a 40-year-old by almost 7 tenths of a second.

During her career, Devers was notable for having exceptionally long, heavily decorated fingernails.  One of the fastest starters in the world, Devers even had to alter her starting position to accommodate her long nails.  Her long nails came as the result of a contest her father devised to get her to stop biting her nails as a child.

Devers' brother was IFBB Professional Bodybuilder Parenthesis "PD" Devers.

Achievements and recognition
In 2011, she was elected into the National Track and Field Hall of Fame.  The following year she was elected into the United States Olympic Hall of Fame. In November 2012, Devers was announced as a 2013 recipient of the NCAA Silver Anniversary Award, presented annually to six distinguished former college student-athletes on the 25th anniversary of the end of their college sports careers.

References

External links

 
 
 
 Gail Devers' struggle with Graves' disease is featured in the 1996 television movie, "Run for the Dream: The Gail Devers Story" starring Charlayne Woodard as Gail Devers and Louis Gossett Jr. as Gail's coach Bob Kersee.

1966 births
Living people
American female sprinters
American female hurdlers
African-American female track and field athletes
Track and field athletes from Seattle
Track and field athletes from San Diego
Olympic gold medalists for the United States in track and field
Athletes (track and field) at the 1988 Summer Olympics
Athletes (track and field) at the 1992 Summer Olympics
Athletes (track and field) at the 1996 Summer Olympics
Athletes (track and field) at the 2000 Summer Olympics
Athletes (track and field) at the 2004 Summer Olympics
Pan American Games gold medalists for the United States
Pan American Games medalists in athletics (track and field)
World Athletics Championships athletes for the United States
World Athletics Championships medalists
World Athletics Indoor Championships winners
World Athletics Indoor Championships medalists
UCLA Bruins women's track and field athletes
Athletes (track and field) at the 1987 Pan American Games
Medalists at the 1996 Summer Olympics
Medalists at the 1992 Summer Olympics
Goodwill Games medalists in athletics
USA Outdoor Track and Field Championships winners
USA Indoor Track and Field Championships winners
World Athletics Championships winners
Competitors at the 2001 Goodwill Games
Medalists at the 1987 Pan American Games
Goodwill Games gold medalists in athletics
21st-century African-American people
21st-century African-American women
20th-century African-American sportspeople
20th-century African-American women